Fishkill is a village within the town of Fishkill in Dutchess County, New York, United States. The village is in the eastern part of the town of Fishkill on U.S. Route 9. It is north of Interstate 84. NY 52 is the main street. It is part of the PoughkeepsieNewburghMiddletown, NY Metropolitan Statistical Area as well as the larger New YorkNewarkBridgeport, NY-NJ-CT-PA Combined Statistical Area. The first U. S. Post Office in New York state was established in Fishkill by Samuel Loudon, its first Postmaster.

History 

Fishkill is located in the former territory of the Wappinger people. It was part of the Rombout Patent granted to Francis Rombouts, Gulian VerPlanck, and Stephanus Van Cortlandt of New Amsterdam in 1685. In 1714, Dutch immigrants settled in the area. The village of Fishkill was a significant crossroads in the overland transportation network in the 18th and 19th centuries. The Kings Highway, connecting Albany to New York City, intersected with a major overland route from New England to the Hudson River. Among the first to occupy the land now within the village limits were Johannes Ter Boss and Henry Rosecrance.

During the American Revolution printer Samuel Loudon fled from New York City during the British occupation of that city and set up a post office in Fishkill, which became the first post office in New York state. Here Loudon also continued printing a revolutionary newspaper called, The New York Packet and The American Advertiser which he  founded while in New York City.

The third New York Provincial Congress convened in Fishkill in May 1776. Fishkill became part of one of the largest colonial military encampments during the Revolutionary War. General Washington's aide-de-camp Alexander Hamilton took residence here. The Trinity Church, on Hopewell Avenue in the village, was organized in 1756 and the structure built in 1760. It was used as a hospital during the Revolutionary War. The Dutch Reformed church was used as a military prison. American spy Enoch Crosby was held there briefly with Loyalist recruits before being allowed to escape.

In 1871, construction began for a schoolhouse on Church Street. The site used for the schoolhouse belonged to the Fishkill Reformed Church and was formerly used as pasture land for the pastor's cow. In 1876, a great fire destroyed many of the old wooden buildings, which were then replaced by brick ones.

In 1996, the animal rights group PETA (led by the organization's president at the time, Jack Earnhardt) suggested the town (and, presumably, the village, as well) change its name to something less suggestive of violence toward fish. The town declined this change because the name is not meant to suggest violence but instead comes from the Dutch who originally settled the land in which "" means "creek". Various other communities also contain the word "" with various prefixes, and a creek in the Catskills called Beaver Kill is a tributary of the Delaware River. Both "Catskill" and "Beaver Kill" could be considered to promote animal violence when their names are improperly understood. This led then-mayor George Carter to joke that if Fishkill is renamed, the Catskills should also be renamed, presumably to the Catsave Mountains.

Geography
The village population was 2,171 at the 2010 census.

Demographics

At the 2000 census, there were 1,735 people, 965 households, and 400 families in the village.  The population density was 1,978.8 people per square mile (761.2/km).  There were 1,011 housing units at an average density of 443.6 /km (1,153.0 /sq mi).  The racial makeup of the village was 93.72% White, 2.77% African American, 0.17% Native American, 1.15% Asian, 0.06% Pacific Islander, 1.27% from other races, and 0.86% from two or more races.  6.05% of the population were Hispanic or Latino of any race. 22.9% were of Italian, 20.2% Irish, 11.2% German, 7.3% American and 5.4% English ancestry according to Census 2000.

Of the 965 households 14.1% had children under the age of 18 living with them, 32.2% were married couples living together, 6.9% have a woman whose husband does not live with her, and 58.5% were non-families. 53.9% of households were one person and 32.8% were one person aged 65 or older.  The average household size was 1.80 and the average family size was 2.74.

The age distribution was 14.1% under the age of 18, 4.9% from 18 to 24, 26.9% from 25 to 44, 23.5% from 45 to 64, and 30.5% 65 or older.  The median age was 48 years. For every 100 females, there were 74.5 males.  For every 100 females age 18 and over, there were 71.3 males.

Males had a median income of  versus  for females. Out of the total people living in poverty, 8.8% are under the age of 18 and 8.9% are 65 or older.

Property value is based on purchase price of properties in the area instead of actual land value causing higher property taxes to existing and new home owners.

Transportation
U.S. Route 9 leads north  to Wappingers Falls, north  to Poughkeepsie, and south  to Peekskill. New York State Route 52 leads west  to Beacon and east  to the Taconic State Parkway in East Fishkill.

Fishkill is served by the bus routes "A", "B", and "F", operated by Dutchess County Public Transit.

Other
The largest employer in the village is Gap Inc. In 2000, the facility opened; in 2001, it expanded. In 2014, the company announced plans to add 1,200 jobs over a 5-year period and invest  into the distribution center.

Notable person
 William J. Hutchins (18131884), a successful businessman and one-time mayor of Houston, Texas, was born in Fishkill.

References

External links

 
 
 
 Blodgett Memorial Library (Fishkill)

1714 establishments in the Province of New York
 
Poughkeepsie–Newburgh–Middletown metropolitan area
Villages in Dutchess County, New York
Villages in New York (state)